Hartmut Weiß (born 13 January 1942) is a German footballer who played as a forward.

He spent seven seasons in the Bundesliga with VfB Stuttgart and Eintracht Braunschweig. Weiß was among the players involved in the 1971 Bundesliga scandal, being sentenced to a lifetime ban in January 1972 for his participation in fixing a match of VfB Stuttgart against Arminia Bielefeld. He later received an amnesty, but never played professional football again.

References

External links
 

1942 births
Living people
Silesian-German people
German footballers
Association football forwards
Bundesliga players
VfB Stuttgart players
VfB Stuttgart II players
Eintracht Braunschweig players
Stuttgarter Kickers players